Mark Goulston is a psychiatrist, executive coach and consultant to major organizations. He is the inventor and developer of the process called Surgical Empathy whereby using targeted and focused empathy, one is able to break through to people and free them from internal emotional and psychological blocks that can impair their functioning, well-being and satisfaction in life.

Early life
Goulston was born in Boston, MA, to Irving Goulston, who rose from bookkeeper to controller and CFO at United Liquors, and Ruth Goulston, who was a homemaker and shop owner. He skipped a grade and graduated early from Newton South High School. He attended the University of Vermont from 1965–66 and then transferred to the University of California, Berkeley, where he received his B.A. in 1969 with a major in Zoology.

From there, he went on to a year of graduate school in Zoology at the University of Massachusetts, Amherst from 19691970 and then on to medical school at Boston University School of Medicine (BUSM), where he took two non-consecutive medical leaves of absence. He attributes this to untreated depression.

During his second leave of absence, he took a three-month medical student elective at the Menninger Psychiatric Clinic in Topeka, Kansas, where he worked with schizophrenics and felt that psychiatry was his calling—that listening and empathy in addition to drugs and ECT were key to addressing even severe mental illness. With renewed focus and his new goal of being a full-dimensioned psychiatrist, he returned to BUSM and completed his MD degree in 1976.

Goulston completed internship at Harbor General Hospital in Torrance, California, and his psychiatric residency at UCLA's famed Neuropsychiatric Institute under supervision and then mentorship of suicidologist Edwin Shneidman and then became assistant clinical professor of psychiatry at UCLA, where he served for over 20 years.

Career
Goulston started a private practice. It specialized in suicide, death, and dying, including making house calls, and working with families and couples. After doing psychiatric house calls to dying patients and their family members, he was sought out to work with the surviving family and their businesses.

That expanded to his being a consultant, speaker, trainer and coach to such organizations as IBM, Goldman Sachs, Merrill Lynch, Xerox, Deutsche Bank, Hyatt, Accenture, Astra Zeneca, British Airways, Sodexo, ESPN, Kodak, Federal Express, YPO, YPOWPO India, Association for Corporate Growth, FBI, Los Angeles District Attorney, White & Case, Seyfarth Shaw, UCLA Anderson School of Management, USC, and Pepperdine University.

He has been interviewed, appeared in or and written for hundreds of major media, including: the New York Times, Wall Street Journal, Forbes, Fortune, Los Angeles Times, CNN, MSNBC, and HLN. He also co-hosts the Zo Williams Morning Radio Show,. In 2016, he became a co-host on It's Your Health with his day entitled, "Dr. G and Lisa," carried on NPR and commercial radio stations,.

In addition to the aforementioned Just Listen, Goulston's seven books include Get Out of Your Own Way: Overcoming Self-Defeating Behavior (Perigee), Get Out of Your Own Way at Work…and Help Others Do the Same (Perigee), The 6 Secrets of a Lasting Relationship (Perigee), and Post-Traumatic Stress Disorder For Dummies.  His sixth book, Real Influence: Persuade Without Pushing and Gain Without Giving In, co-authored with Dr. John Ullmen, was published in 2013 and was selected as the lead book for the American Management Association and as one of the 30 Best Business Books for 2013 by Soundview Executive Summaries. In 2015, Goulston's seventh book, Talking to Crazy: How to Deal with the Irrational and Impossible People in Your Life, was published by Amacom Books, which went on to be an Oprah featured book, and to be an Audie Awards 2016 Finalist,.

Goulston sits on the board of advisors at HealthCorps (Dr. Mehmet Oz's foundation) and American Women Veterans, and he is a Fellow of the American Psychiatric Association. He is also the Co-Founder, Co-Curator and Co-Guardian of Heartfelt Leadership, an effort to bring more humanity and ultimately more profit to the workplace.

Goulston is also co-developer of The Exam Performance Program (R), an eLearning course which teaches students how to be calm, confident and focused so they can perform better and score better on academic exams and standardized tests.  The course has been developed to (I) improve student cognitive performance and test scores on academic exams and standardized tests, (II) improve student mindset, self-confidence, self-efficacy, motivation, engagement, retention and academic trajectory, (III) eliminate/prevent test-anxiety and "stereotype-threat", and (IV) motivate STEM achievement, especially in low-income/minority/female/foster-care student groups.

In 2015, Goulston became Chief Mentor and a principal at China Foundations and in 2016 he became a principal and Board Advisor to the transdisciplinary consulting firm Alchemy.

In 2015, Goulston founded and became CEO of the Goulston Group. Companies and organizations hired the Goulston Group when they want to significantly increase "buy in" and sustained engagement from customers/clients, investors and talent they are hoping to attract. They do this by causes such people to think to themselves, "gotta have it!" "gotta buy it!" "gotta invest there!" or "gotta work there!"

He extended his writing by being a contributing writer for Business Journals, which goes to 43 city business journals and has collectively 13 million unique visitors to their digital sites.

Beginning in late 2016, Goulston also began performing a one-man show, entitled "Steve Jobs Returns  How to Think Like a Visionary", that Goulston wrote, produced, directed and starred in and is currently performing that show nationally.

In 2017, he began hosting the weekly Prison Letters with Dr. Mark Goulston podcast.

In October 2017, Goulston ventured to Moscow to provide a one-day training for Best Business Ideas to 400+ CEO's, managers from the Russian Federation and HR directors on the topic of his book, "Just Listen," whose Russian edition was, "I Hear You Through and Through". Related to that visit, Goulston was interviewed by the Russian business publication, RBC, in an article entitled, Managers Hate the Word "People" which resulted in a record 455,000 views.

In October 2018, Goulston began hosting the "My Wakeup Call" weekly podcast where he interviews influencers about what matters most to them and there journey and personal wakeup calls to arriving at that commitment.

In April 2019, Goulston was honored with the First Dr. W. Mark Warfel Resilient Heart Award at the Healthcorp Annual Gala in NYC.

In August 2019, Goulston launched @wmystglobal, a global movement to combat disconnect, loneliness and unhappiness using the power of tactical kindness.

In March 2019, Goulston co-created and moderated a multi-honored documentary: Stay Alive: An Intimate Conversation about Suicide Prevention.

In May 2019, Goulston presented a session at the International Academy of Mediators in Banff, Alberta, Canada.

In October 2019, Goulston returned to Moscow to give a presentation along with Nobel laureate Daniel Kahneman. This was partially because his most recent book, Talking to Crazy, which, when translated into Russian became How to Talk With Dicks, became a national bestseller and went viral.

In October 2019, Goulston presented "A Novel Approach to De-stigmatizing Mental Illness: Design Thinking Suicide Prevention" at the California Community College Mental Health and Wellness Fall Conference.

During the pandemic, Goulston co-authored with Diana Hendel, Why Cope When You Can Heal? How Healthcare Heroes of Covid-19 Can Recover from PTSD, and, Trauma to Triumph: A Roadmap for Leading through Disruption and Thriving on the Other Side.

He is the host of My Wakeup Call a podcast where guests conversationally share their purpose and calling and their origin story and wakeup calls that led them there.

In 2022, Dr. Goulston was honored with "The Shine the Light Media Award," by the Los Angeles County Medical Association's Patient Care Foundation for his focus on bringing attention to mental health and teen suicide.

In 2022 Goulston became Executive Producer of the documentary, What I Wish My Parents Knew, a film directed by Jason Reid interviewing teenagers about their lowest points mentally and emotionally.

Goulston currently serves on the Board of Advisors at: Healthcorps and BiasSync.

"Surgical Empathy"
Surgical Empathy has been used to break through to suicidal teenagers and young adults, to help people including healthcare professionals recover from and in many cases heal from PTSD, and to assist organizations and companies with overcoming implicit bias. As Goulston has said, "If you can't get people to understand how you feel, get them to 'feel what you feel'."

One of the techniques in Surgical Empathy is the "Five Reallys," that Goulston learned from Lt. General Martin Steele, who employed it in helping transitioning U.S. Marines from 2006 to 2008. The "Five Reallys" is a technique where you listen empathically to what people are saying and keep repeating, "I understand that, but what's really going on?" Eventually people will reveal that and when they do and you just listen without rushing in to give them advice or a solution, they will often begin to cry with relief, calm down and be better able to think of solutions with you.

For more than twenty years, Goulston used Surgical Empathy as his principal approach as a psychiatrist with a focus on suicide prevention and none of his patients died by suicide. He is the co-creator and moderator of the multi-honored documentary, Stay Alive: A Personal Conversation about Suicide Prevention. His book, Just Listen, ranked No. 1 in six Amazon/Kindle categories, has been translated into 24 languages, reached No. 1 in Munich and Shanghai, and became the basis of a 2010 PBS special. The Consumers Research Council three times named him one of America's top psychiatrists, including in 2011. For over 20 years, he has been Clinical Assistant Professor of Medicine at UCLA's Neuropsychiatric Institute. Goulston has appeared on Oprah, The Today Show, The Phil Donahue Show, CNN, and hosted a PBS pledge drive special. His column Solve Anything with Dr. Mark is nationally syndicated by Tribune Media Services. He blogs for the Huffington Post, Psychology Today, Fast Company, and Business Insider,  contributes to the Harvard Business Review and writes a syndicated column for "Biz Journals",. He is a TEDx speaker and frequently gives keynote speeches at women's conferences.

Personal life
Goulston lives in Los Angeles with his wife and three children.

References

1948 births
Living people
American psychiatrists
Boston University School of Medicine alumni
Newton South High School alumni
University of California, Los Angeles faculty
University of California, Berkeley alumni